Henry Gabriels (October 6 1838 – April 23 1921) was a Belgian-born prelate of the Roman Catholic Church who served as bishop of the Diocese of Ogdensburg in Northern New York from 1892 until his death in 1921.

Biography

Early life 
Henry Gabriels was born on October 6, 1838, at Wannegem-Lede, East Flanders in Belgium. He studied classics at St. Mary's College in Oudenaarde and philosophy at the St. Joseph Minor Seminary in Ghent.  In 1858, having decided to enter the priesthood, he enrolled in St. Nicholas Seminary in Ghent, where he studied theology for two years. In late 1860, Gabriels entered the University of Leuven in Leuven.

Priesthood 
Gabriels was ordained to the priesthood on September 21, 1861. He received a Bachelor of Theology degree in 1862 and a Licentiate in Theology in 1864. That same year, Archbishop John McCloskey of New York was attempting to establish a provincial seminary in New York, which would train priests for multiple dioceses in the Northeastern United States.  He asked Bishop Louis-Joseph Delebecque of Ghent to suggest some priests who might want to work at the new St. Joseph's Seminary in Troy, New York. Delebecque proposed four new priests, including Gabriels.  When McCloskey offered him a faculty chair at St. Joseph's, Gabriels eagerly agreed. 

Gabriels arrived in New York on October 17, 1864.  He served as professor of dogma for seven years at St. Joseph's.  He was able to visit his family in Belgium in 1867.  In 1868, Gabriels learned about a small community of German and Irish Catholics near Sand Lake, New York, who did not have a church or a priest.  Since Gabriels spoke some German, he started spending time there, celebrating mass in a private residence and organizing a new parish.

By 1870, Gabriels was also teaching church history at St. Joseph's. On July 1, 1871, now Cardinal McCloskey appointed Gabriels as president of St. Joseph's, a position he would hold until 1892.

In 1882, the University of Leuven awarded Gabriels an honorary Doctor of Theology degree.  When the Fourth Provincial Council of New York was held in New York City in 1883, he served as secretary.  For the Third Plenary Council of Baltimore in Baltimore, Maryland in 1884, Gabriels was named as a general secretary.

Bishop of Ogdensburg 
On December 20, 1891, Gabriels was appointed as the second bishop of the Diocese of Ogdensburg by Pope Leo XIII. He received his episcopal consecration on May 5, 1892, from Archbishop Michael Corrigan, with Bishops Francis McNeirny and Patrick Anthony Ludden serving as co-consecrators, at the Cathedral of the Immaculate Conception in Albany, New York. He was installed at St. Mary's Cathedral in Ogdensburg by Bishop Bernard McQuaid on May 11, 1892.  In 1894, the Gabriels Sanitarium for tuberculosis patients opened in a hamlet that became known as Gabriels, New York.

Charles George Hebermann, editor of the Catholic Encyclopedia, gave this description of Gabriels:Conscientious in the discharge of his duties, ever ready to go where duty called, affable to all, both rich and poor, zealous for the interests of the Church, he was soon known in every part of the diocese, and where he was known, he was loved and respected.On August 1, 1906, Gabriels met in Rome with Pope Pius X, giving him a message from U.S. President Theodore Roosevelt and a Peter's Pence contribution of $1350.

Gabriels wrote the "Diocese of Ogdensburg" article for the Catholic Encyclopedia. He was an officer of the Order of Leopold.During his twenty-nine years as bishop, he established several churches and schools.

Death 
Henry Gabriels died on April 23, 1921, at age 82.  The Gabriels Sanitarium campus was purchased in 1965 by Paul Smith College, then sold to the State of New York to become Camp Gabriels, a medium security prison, in 1982.  The prison closed in 2009.  The hamlet of Gabriels still exists.

References

1838 births
1921 deaths
People from East Flanders
Belgian emigrants to the United States
19th-century Belgian Roman Catholic priests
19th-century Roman Catholic bishops in the United States
Roman Catholic bishops of Ogdensburg
Contributors to the Catholic Encyclopedia
20th-century Roman Catholic bishops in the United States